Deșteptarea was a newspaper from the Republic of Moldova founded on May 20, 1989 as a newspaper of the Popular Front of Moldova. Ștefan Secăreanu was the editor in chief and Sergiu Burcă was the deputy editor in chief. The first two issues were printed in the Baltic states. After August 1990, its successor was Țara.

See also
 Glasul

Bibliography
 Partidul Popular Creștin Democrat. Documente și materiale. 1998-2008. Volumul I (1988–1994).

References

External links 
 Istoric

Defunct newspapers published in Moldova
Mass media in Chișinău
Popular Front of Moldova
Newspapers established in 1989
Publications disestablished in 1990
Romanian-language newspapers published in Moldova